Aristide Benoît Zogbo (born 30 December 1981) is an Ivorian former professional footballer who played as a goalkeeper. He made three appearances for the Ivory Coast national team and was part of the squads at the 2010 Africa Cup of Nations and the 2010 FIFA World Cup.

Club career
Zogbo was born in Abidjan, Ivory Coast.

He was signed on 1 July 2007 by Ittihad El Shorta in Egypt, joining from Issia Wazi.

Zogbo played for Ittihad El-Shorta until 3 September 2009, and signed then a one-year contract with Israeli club Maccabi Netanya.

International career
His debut for the Les Éléphants was on 20 August 2008 against Guinea in Paris, in a friendly game.

Career statistics

International
Source:

Honours
 Ivory Coast Cup: winner 2006, runner-up: 2007

References

External links
 
 
 
 
 

1981 births
Living people
Ivorian footballers
Footballers from Abidjan
Expatriate footballers in Egypt
Ivory Coast international footballers
2010 Africa Cup of Nations players
2010 FIFA World Cup players
Maccabi Netanya F.C. players
Ivorian expatriate sportspeople in Israel
Expatriate footballers in Israel
Association football goalkeepers
Ivorian expatriate sportspeople in Egypt
Issia Wazy players
Israeli Premier League players
Ittihad El Shorta SC players